Lyubov Kochetova (born 7 May 1982) is a Russian equestrian. She competed in the individual jumping event at the 2008 Summer Olympics.

References

1982 births
Living people
Russian female equestrians
Olympic equestrians of Russia
Equestrians at the 2008 Summer Olympics
Sportspeople from Leningrad Oblast